Sainsbury's Freezer Centres was a former frozen food chain, operated by the then-largest UK supermarket chain (now the second largest supermarket chain) Sainsbury's.

The company decided to open the shops in response to competition from specialist frozen food chains, such as Bejam. It also allowed Sainsbury's to make use of its valuable freehold counter service stores (that were too small for conversion to self-service).

The first shop opened at Southbourne near Bournemouth in 1974. It was not an immediate success as many of the elderly residents living in the area did not own a freezer. Only 11% of households at that time owned freezers. Nine other branches that followed suit in that year, however, had greater success. They sold about 3,000 lines, many with deep discounts.

In 1975, new build stores or refurbished ones had frozen food departments built into them. Chippenham was the first branch to have this integrated.

By 1980, there were 21 freezer centres, and by 1982, 49% of households owned a freezer.

Sainsbury's sold Sainsbury's Freezer Centres to Bejam in 1986. In 1989, Bejam became part of the Iceland chain.

See also

Sainsbury's

References
Sainsbury Archive: Sainsbury's Freezer Centres

External links
J Sainsbury plc
Sainsbury's

Sainsbury's
Retail companies established in 1974
Defunct supermarkets of the United Kingdom